Season 3 of Dance Plus started on 1 July 2017 on STAR Plus and produced by Urban Brew Studios. Winner was Bir Radha Sherpa, from team Punit. Other three contestants from Top four were from Dharmesh's team, a new record for the finalists. Amardeep Singh Natt became the first runner up, Aryan Patra became the second runner up and Shivani and Tarun were the third runner up. All the finalists won the hearts of public with their entertaining and excellent performances. Overall, Team Dharmesh has two winners from season one and two, Team Punit has one and Shakti Mohan has none. Show is acclaimed and very popular due to creative format and uniqueness.

Super judge
Remo D'Souza is the super judge for this season also. He is a well known and reputed choreographer and film director. He directed movies like F.A.L.T.U., Any Body Can Dance (ABCD and ABCD 2), A Flying Jatt and Race 3. He was also judge on Jhalak Dikhla Ja and Dance India Dance (seasons 1, 2 and 3).

Captains
There are three captains on the show.
Dharmesh Yelande
Shakti Mohan
Punit Pathak

Each mentor has their own team consisting of contestants selected in auditions. There will be one final winner at the end of the show.

Urban Brew Studios produces the first, second and third seasons of Dance+ on STAR Plus.

Scoring
Each captain will give a challenge to one artist each from the other two teams. The challenges are:
Theme round
Prop round
Best foot forward
The captain who gave the challenge can score out of five and the super judge can score out of ten. The super judge can also give five additional points.

The fourth round is the international squad challenge in which one member of each team has to match the level of dancing of the international dancer. This round is also scored out of ten by the super judge and he can give an additional five points.

Based on the scores of these rounds, two teams go to the final showdown. The fourth artist from each team performs and the super judge chooses the winner. The winning team's captain nominates two artists from his or her team to go forward and the super judge chooses the artist who will go to top eight.

Top twelve artists

International squad challenge
In Dance plus season 3, D'Souza added a new challenge for dancers. Here he will invite an international dance artist every week.

Top eight artists

Top four artists

Special guests

See also
List of dance style categories
Dance Plus
Dance Plus (season 2)

References

2017 Indian television seasons